Hypericum prietoi is a species of shrub in the family Hypericaceae. It is endemic to Ecuador, where it has only been collected once, in 1945.

References

prietoi
Endemic flora of Ecuador
Taxonomy articles created by Polbot